Al-Sīrah al-Nabawiyyah, by Ibn Ishaq, 'The Life of the Prophet'; is a biography of the Islamic Prophet Muhammad, written in Arabic by Ibn Ishaq. It is officially recognized as the first book on Prophetic biography (Sirah). That is why Ibn Ishaq is called the father of Sirah literature. Later, Ibn Hisham published a revised version of the book, which Known as Al-Sirah al-Nabawiyyah (Ibn Hisham).

Original version, survival 
Ibn Isḥaq collected oral traditions about the life of the Islamic prophet Muhammad. These traditions, which he orally dictated to his pupils, are now known collectively as Sīrat Rasūl Allāh ( "Life of the Messenger of God") and survive mainly in the following sources:

 An edited copy, or recension, of his work by his student al-Bakka'i, which was further edited by ibn Hisham. Al-Bakka'i's work has perished and only ibn Hisham's has survived, in copies. Ibn Hisham edited out of his work "things which it is disgraceful to discuss; matters which would distress certain people; and such reports as al-Bakka'i told me he could not accept as trustworthy."
 An edited copy, or recension, prepared by his student Salamah ibn Fadl al-Ansari. This also has perished, and survives only in the copious extracts to be found in the voluminous History of the Prophets and Kings by Muhammad ibn Jarir al-Tabari.
 Fragments of several other recensions. Guillaume lists them on p. xxx of his preface, but regards most of them as so fragmentary as to be of little worth.

According to Donner, the material in ibn Hisham and al-Tabari is "virtually the same". However, there is some material to be found in al-Tabari that was not preserved by ibn Hisham. For example, al-Tabari includes the controversial episode of the Satanic Verses, while ibn Hisham does not.

Following the publication of previously unknown fragments of ibn Isḥaq's traditions, recent scholarship suggests that ibn Isḥaq did not commit to writing any of the traditions now extant, but they were narrated orally to his transmitters. These new texts, found in accounts by Salama al-Ḥarranī and Yūnus ibn Bukayr, were hitherto unknown and contain versions different from those found in other works.

Al-Sirah al-Nabawiyyah (Ibn Hisham) 

The original text of the Sīrat Rasūl Allāh by Ibn Ishaq did not survive. Yet it was one of the earliest substantial biographies of Muhammad. However, much of the original text was copied over into a work of his own by Ibn Hisham (Basra; Fustat, died 833 AD, 218 AH).

Interpolations made by Ibn Hisham are said to be recognizable and can be deleted, leaving as a remainder, a so-called "edited" version of Ibn Ishaq's original text (otherwise lost). In addition,  points out that Ibn Hisham's version omits various narratives in the text which were given by al-Tabari in his History. In these passages al-Tabari expressly cites Ibn Ishaq as a source.

Thus can be reconstructed an 'improved' "edited" text, i.e., by distinguishing or removing Ibn Hisham's additions, and by adding from al-Tabari passages attributed to Ibn Ishaq. Yet the result's degree of approximation to Ibn Ishaq's original text can only be conjectured. Such a reconstruction is available, e.g., in Guillaume's translation. Here, Ibn Ishaq's introductory chapters describe pre-Islamic Arabia, before he then commences with the narratives surrounding the life of Muhammad (in ).

Translations 
In 1864 the Heidelberg professor Gustav Weil published an annotated German translation in two volumes. Several decades later the Hungarian scholar Edward Rehatsek prepared an English translation, but it was not published until over a half-century later.

The best-known translation in a Western language is Alfred Guillaume's 1955 English translation, but some have questioned the reliability of this translation. In it Guillaume combined ibn Hisham and those materials in al-Tabari cited as ibn Isḥaq's whenever they differed or added to ibn Hisham, believing that in so doing he was restoring a lost work. The extracts from al-Tabari are clearly marked, although sometimes it is difficult to distinguish them from the main text (only a capital "T" is used).

See also
 Prophetic biography
 List of biographies of Muhammad
 List of Islamic scholars
 List of Sunni books

Notes

References

Sources
 
 
 
 

Biographies of Muhammad
Sunni literature
8th-century Arabic books